Erik Rolando de Jesús Delgado (born November 8, 1982) is an Ecuadorian footballer currently playing for Valle del Chota. He is a regular starter and plays as a right back  for his club.

Club career
De Jesús started at Nacional when he was young. He has spent all his career at Nacional. He won many titles with the juveniles during his time. In 2003, he was promoted to  the first team of his club. However, in 2005-2006 he was a champion with El Nacional as they won the clausura of the Ecuadorian league. His good displays of defending earned him a chance to play with the national team in 2006.

International career
De Jesús played in the 3-1 friendly win for Ecuador against Haiti in March 2008.

References

External links

1982 births
Living people
People from Ibarra, Ecuador
Association football fullbacks
Ecuadorian footballers
Ecuador international footballers
C.D. El Nacional footballers
C.S.D. Independiente del Valle footballers